American Roots Music is a 2001 multi-part documentary film that explores the historical roots of American Roots music through footage and performances by the creators of the movement: Folk, Country, Blues, Gospel, Bluegrass, and many others.

This PBS film series is available as an 'in-class' teaching tool.

Notable musicians that appear in this documentary are:
Kris Kristofferson (as narrator) 
Bonnie Raitt
Robbie Robertson
Bob Dylan
Eddie Vedder
Mike Seeger
Ricky Skaggs
Marty Stuart
Rufus Thomas
Doc Watson
James Cotton
Bela Fleck
Douglas B. Green
Arlo Guthrie 
Flaco Jiménez
B.B. King
Bruce Springsteen
Steven Van Zandt
Robert Mirabal
Keb' Mo'
Willie Nelson
Sam Phillips
Bernice Johnson Reagon
Keith Richards
Earl Scruggs
Ralph Stanley

References

External links

PBS Site
Epitonic review
Teachinghistory.org review of companion website

American documentary films
2001 television films
2001 films
Documentary films about music and musicians
Films directed by Jim Brown
2000s English-language films
2000s American films